Karl Ruberl (October 3, 1881 – December 12, 1966), A.K.A. Charles Ruberl Sr., was an Austrian swimmer who competed in the late 19th century and early 20th century in the 200 meter events. He participated in swimming at the 1900 Summer Olympics in Paris and won the silver medal in the 200 meter backstroke and the bronze medal in the 200 meter freestyle.

At the 1900 Summer Olympics, Ruberl competed in three events, in the 200 metre freestyle he swam in the last heat which he won and in the process and a set new Olympic record time of 2 minutes 22.6 seconds, unfortunately he couldn't repeat the time in the final and finished in third place earning a bronze medal. He also competed in the 200 metre backstroke and again he won his heat in a time of 2 minutes 56 seconds, in the final he swam the same time and finished in silver medal position. Ruberl also competed in the 200 metre obstacle event, where he came second in his heat and then finished fourth in the final.

After the Olympics Karl immigrated to (1900) and then became a naturalized citizen (1904) of the United States of America. During this process he changed his name to Charles Ruberl. He continued competitive swimming for the New York Athletic Club and set several American swimming records and in 1903 he won three National titles.  After his swimming career he went into banking, and then helped found Bainbridge, Ryan & Ruberl – a stock brokerage firm trading on the New York Stock Exchange.  Mr. Ruberl also was an accomplished musician and performed with the Brooklyn Academy of Music on violin and piano. He retired before the 1929 stock market crash and lived in New York City until his death in 1966.  He was a friend of Otto Wahle, another Austrian swimmer who also immigrated to the US.

Karl married Lida St. George and is survived, as of 10/2007, by four great grandchildren, four grandchildren and a daughter-in-law - all of whom reside in the US.

References

External links
 

1881 births
1966 deaths
Austrian male backstroke swimmers
Austrian male freestyle swimmers
Olympic swimmers of Austria
Swimmers at the 1900 Summer Olympics
Olympic silver medalists for Austria
Olympic bronze medalists for Austria
Swimmers from Vienna
Olympic bronze medalists in swimming
Medalists at the 1900 Summer Olympics
Olympic silver medalists in swimming
Austrian emigrants to the United States